= Aromadendron =

Aromadendron may refer to:

- Aromadendron Andrews ex Steud., a synonym for Eucalyptus
- Aromadendron Blume, a subsection of the genus Magnolia
